Leucosia  is a genus of crabs in the family Leucosiidae, containing the following extant species:

Leucosia affinis Bell, 1855
Leucosia anatum (Herbst, 1783)
Leucosia brevimana Bell, 1855
Leucosia brevior Ortmann, 1892
Leucosia compressa Shen & Chen, 1978
Leucosia corallicola Alcock, 1896
Leucosia craniolaris (Linnaeus, 1758)
Leucosia formosensis Sakai, 1937
Leucosia haswelli Miers, 1886
Leucosia jecusculum (Rathbun, 1911)
Leucosia laevimana Miers, 1884
Leucosia leslii Haswell, 1879
Leucosia longibrachia Shen & Chen, 1978
Leucosia longimaculata Chen & Fang, 1991
Leucosia margaritacea Bell, 1855
Leucosia moresbiensis Haswell, 1880
Leucosia ocellata Bell, 1855
Leucosia pacifica Poeppig, 1836
Leucosia phyllocheira White, 1847
Leucosia pulcherrima Miers, 1877
Leucosia punctata Bell, 1855
Leucosia reticulata Miers, 1877
Leucosia rubripalma Galil, 2003
Leucosia sima Alcock, 1896
Leucosia tetraodon Bouvier, 1914
Leucosia whitmeei Miers, 1875

References

Crabs

ja:ツノナガコブシ